Radical 53 or  radical dotted cliff meaning "house on cliff" is one of the 31 Kangxi radicals (214 radicals in total) composed of three strokes.

In the Kangxi Dictionary, there are 15 characters (out of 49,030) to be found under this radical.

 is also the 46th indexing component in the Table of Indexing Chinese Character Components predominantly adopted by Simplified Chinese dictionaries published in mainland China. In addition, this character is also the simplified form of  guǎng, hence called / guǎngzìtóu chiefly by Simplified Chinese users.

Evolution

Derived characters

Literature

External links

Unihan Database - U+5E7F

053
046